Yerba mora is a common name of Spanish origin for several plants and may refer to:

Solanum americanum
Solanum nigrum, native to Eurasia